The 1990–91 Botola is the 35th season of the Moroccan Premier League. Wydad Casablanca are the holders of the title.

References

Morocco 1990–91

Botola seasons
Morocco
Botola